Aravenu is a village in Kotagiri Taluk of The Nilgiris District, Tamil Nadu, India.  The population is largely Badaga and it is thought to be an original Badaga Hatti.  It is the headquarters of the Jackanarai panchayat.

This is one of the Nilgiri Ghat Roads. A further road links Aravenu directly with Coonoor via Bandishola.

The area is rich in wildlife.  Indian bison can be spotted grazing in the wooded areas. Other animals that thrive here include leopards, spotted deer and wild boar.

References

Villages in Nilgiris district